The following is a list of fusor examples, examples of the fusor-type nuclear fusion reactor that uses inertial electrostatic confinement

Professional
Fusors have been theoretically studied at multiple institutions, including: Kyoto University, and Kyushu University.  Researchers meet annually at the US-Japan Workshop on Inertial Electrostatic Confinement Fusion.  Listed here, are actual machines built.

Tokyo Institute of Technology has four IEC devices of different shapes: a spherical machine, a cylindrical device, a co-axial double cylinder and a magnetically assisted device.
University of Wisconsin-Madison  A group at Wisconsin-Madison has been running a very large, funded, fusor program since 1991.
Turkish Atomic Energy Authority In 2013 this team built a 30 cm fusor at the Saraykoy Nuclear Research and Training center in Turkey.  This fusor can reach 85 kV and do deuterium fusion, producing  neutrons per second.
University of Illinois  Dr. George Miley's team at the fusion studies laboratory has built a ~25 cm fusor which has produced  neutrons using deuterium gas.
University of Sydney  Dr. Joseph Khachan's group in the Department of Physics has built a variety of IEC devices in both positive and negative polarities and spherical and cylindrical geometries.
Atomic Energy Organization of Iran  Researchers at Shahid Beheshti University in Iran have built a 60 cm diameter fusor which can produce  neutrons per second at 140 kV using deuterium gas.
Los Alamos National Laboratory  In the late nineties, researchers purposed and built a fusor-like system for oscillating plasma, inside a fusor. This device is known as the Periodically Oscillating Plasma Sphere or POPS.
Massachusetts Institute of Technology For his doctoral thesis in 2007, Carl Dietrich built a fusor and studied its potential use in spacecraft propulsion.  In addition, Tom McGuire did his thesis on fusors with multiple cages and ion guns.
ITT Corporation Hirschs original machine was a 17.8 cm diameter machine with 150 kV voltage drop across it.  This machine used ion beams.
Phoenix Nuclear Labs Has developed a commercial neutron source based on a fusor, achieving  neutrons per second with the deuterium-deuterium fusion reaction.

Amateur 

A number of amateurs have built working fusors and detected neutrons.  Many fusor enthusiasts connect on forums and message boards online. Below are some examples of working fusors. 
 
 Richard Hull Since the late nineties, Richard Hull has built several fusors in his home in Richmond, Virginia.  In March 1999, he achieved a neutron rate of  neutrons per second.  Hull maintains a list of amateurs who have detected neutrons from fusors.
 Carl Greninger Founded the Northwest Nuclear Consortium, an organization in Washington state which teaches a class of a dozen high school students nuclear engineering principles using a 60 kV fusor.
Taylor Wilson built a Fusor at 14 years old in 2008.
 Matthew Honickman Was a high school student who built a working fusor in his basement in Rochester, New York.
 Michael Li In 2003, Michael Li became the youngest person to date to build a fusor, winning second place in the US Intel Science Talent Search winning a $75,000 college scholarship.
 Mark Suppes A web designer for Gucci in Brooklyn New York, built a working fusor on a path to building the first amateur Polywell.
Thiago David Olson Built a 40 kV fusor at age 17, in his home in Rochester, Michigan and placed second in the Intel International Science and Engineering Fair in 2007.
 Jamie Edwards who fused the atom at 13, at his middle school in England.  He received a letter from the Duke of York, was invited on The David Letterman Show and gave a TED talk. 
 Conrad Farnsworth of Newcastle, Wyoming produced fusion in 2011 at 17 and used this to win a regional and state science fair.

References

See also
 Inertial confinement fusion
 Nuclear fusion

Fusion power
Neutron sources
Fusion reactors
American inventions
Plasma physics